Self-Portrait is a 1986 work by the American artist Andy Warhol.  The portrait is in a camouflage-patterned foreground with a black background.

Analysis
Andy Warhol made Self-portrait a few months before his death, which was in February 1987. 

It uses a Polaroid photograph of him, with the material of acrylic polymer paint and silk screen printing to produce a camouflage pattern over the face surrounded by black.

The Metropolitan Museum of Art describes the image: "Warhol appears as a haunting, disembodied mask. His head floats in a dark black void and his face and hair are ghostly pale, covered in a militaristic camouflage pattern of green, gray, and black." 

There is a contrast between the impersonality of the camouflage pattern, which hints at danger, and the personality of the portrait tradition, where there is direct contact with the viewer, although in this case with a protective illusory covering.  The ambiguous uses of camouflage—drawing attention when a fashionable look and doing the opposite in military use—fascinated Warhol.

A version in the Philadelphia Museum of Art uses pink and magenta on the same black background. Another version similar to the one kept at the Philadelphia Museum of Art is part of the National Gallery of Victoria's modern art collection.

Notes

External links
Version in the Philadelphia Museum of Art

Paintings by Andy Warhol
1986 paintings
Self-portraits
20th-century portraits
Paintings in the collection of the Metropolitan Museum of Art
Camouflage patterns